The 2017 Colorado Rapids season was the club's 22nd season of existence, and their 22nd season in Major League Soccer, the top tier of the American soccer pyramid.

Current squad

Player movement

In 
Per Major League Soccer and club policies terms of the deals do not get disclosed.

Out

Loans 
Per Major League Soccer and club policies terms of the deals do not get disclosed.

In

Preseason

Desert Diamond Cup

Competitions

MLS

Standings

Western Conference

Overall table

Results summary

Results by round

Results

U.S. Open Cup

Squad statistics

Appearances and goals

|-
|colspan="14"|Players away from Colorado Rapids on loan:

|-
|colspan="14"|Players who left Colorado Rapids during the season:

|}

Goal scorers

Updated July 24, 2017

Disciplinary record

References

Colorado Rapids seasons
Colorado Rapids
Colorado Rapids
Colorado Rapids